Madhukunda railway station serves Madhukunda, Tiluri village and surrounding areas in Purulia and Bankura districts in the Indian state of West Bengal. It is located on the southern bank of the Damodar and a railway bridge connects it to Damodar railway station.

History
The Bengal Nagpur Railway main line from Nagpur to Asansol, on the Howrah–Delhi main line, was opened for goods traffic on 1 February 1891.

Electrification
The Tatanagar–Adra–Asansol section was electrified in the 1957–1962 period. The Asansol–Purulia sector was electrified in 1961–62.

Economy
There is a cement plant, Damodhar Cement Works, owned by ACC Ltd. at Madhukunda.

References

External links
Trains at Madhukunda

Adra railway division
Railway stations in Purulia district